The 1989 San Francisco Giants season was the Giants' 107th season in Major League Baseball, their 32nd season in San Francisco since their move from New York following the 1957 season, and their 30th at Candlestick Park.  The Giants finished in first place in the National League West with a record of 92 wins and 70 losses. It was their second division title in three years. The Giants defeated the Chicago Cubs in five games in the National League Championship Series. However, they were swept by their cross-Bay rivals, the Oakland Athletics, in an earthquake-marred World Series.

Offseason
December 8, 1988: Mike Aldrete was traded by the San Francisco Giants to the Montreal Expos for Tracy Jones.
February 27, 1989: Ernie Camacho was signed as a free agent with the San Francisco Giants.

Regular season

Opening Day Lineup

Season standings

Record vs. opponents

Notable transactions
April 14, 1989: Goose Gossage was signed as a free agent with the San Francisco Giants.
June 5, 1989: Clay Bellinger was drafted by the San Francisco Giants in the 2nd round of the 1989 amateur draft. Player signed June 8, 1989.
June 16, 1989: Tracy Jones was traded by the San Francisco Giants to the Detroit Tigers for Pat Sheridan.
June 18, 1989: Charlie Hayes was traded by the San Francisco Giants with Dennis Cook and Terry Mulholland to the Philadelphia Phillies for a player to be named later and Steve Bedrosian. The Philadelphia Phillies sent Rick Parker (August 7, 1989) to the San Francisco Giants to complete the trade.
 August 2, 1989: Bob Brenly signed as a free agent.
August 10, 1989: Goose Gossage was selected off waivers by the New York Yankees from the San Francisco Giants.

Major League debuts
Batters: Mike Benjamin (July 7),  Greg Litton (May 2)
Pitchers: Randy McCament (June 28),  Russ Swan (August 3),  Stu Tate (September 20)

Game log and schedule

|-  style="text-align:center; background:#bfb;"
| 1 || April 3 || @ Padres || 5–3 || Reuschel (1–0) || || LaCoss (1) || Jack Murphy Stadium || 52,763 || 1–0 || W1
|-  style="text-align:center; background:#bfb;"
| 2 || April 4 || @ Padres || 8–3 || Downs (1–0) || || || Jack Murphy Stadium || 21,768 || 2–0 || W2
|-  style="text-align:center; background:#fbb;"
| 3 || April 5 || @ Padres || 3–4 || || Robinson (0–1) || || Jack Murphy Stadium || 24,309 || 2–1 || L1
|-  style="text-align:center; background:#fbb;"
| 4 || April 7 || @ Reds || 3–4 (16) || || Price (0–1) || || Riverfront Stadium || 25,278 || 2–2 || L2
|-  style="text-align:center; background:#bfb;"
| 5 || April 9 || @ Reds || 9–1 || Reuschel (2–0) || || || Riverfront Stadium || 23,152 || 3–2 || W1
|-  style="text-align:center; background:#fbb;"
| 6 || April 10 || Dodgers || 4–7 || || LaCoss (0–1) || || Candlestick Park || 53,015 || 3–3 || L1
|-  style="text-align:center; background:#bfb;"
| 7 || April 11 || Dodgers || 8–3 || Downs (2–0) || || Lefferts (1) || Candlestick Park || 17,722 || 4–3 || W1
|-  style="text-align:center; background:#bfb;"
| 8 || April 12 || Dodgers || 3–1 || Garrelts (1–0) || || LaCoss (2) || Candlestick Park || 19,035 || 5–3 || W2
|-  style="text-align:center; background:#bfb;"
| 9 || April 14 || Braves || 7–5 || Reuschel (3–0) || || Lefferts (2) || Candlestick Park || 11,808 || 6–3 || W3
|-  style="text-align:center; background:#bfb;"
| 10 || April 15 || Braves || 1–0 || Hammaker (1–0) || || || Candlestick Park || 29,798 || 7–3 || W4
|-  style="text-align:center; background:#fbb;"
| 11 || April 16 || Braves || 2–7 || || Downs (2–1) || || Candlestick Park || n/a || 7–4 || L1
|-  style="text-align:center; background:#bfb;"
| 12 || April 16 || Braves || 6–1 || Price (1–1) || || || Candlestick Park || 26,048 || 8–4 || W1
|-  style="text-align:center; background:#bfb;"
| 13 || April 17 || Padres || 9–0 || Garrelts (2–0) || || || Candlestick Park || 12,161 || 9–4 || W2
|-  style="text-align:center; background:#fbb;"
| 14 || April 18 || Padres || 2–4 || || Reuschel (3–1) || || Candlestick Park || 11,509 || 9–5 || L1
|-  style="text-align:center; background:#fbb;"
| 15 || April 19 || Padres || 3–4 || || Hammaker (1–1) || || Candlestick Park || 22,701 || 9–6 || L2
|-  style="text-align:center; background:#fbb;"
| 16 || April 21 || @ Dodgers || 2–8 || || Downs (2–2) || || Dodger Stadium || 47,251 || 9–7 || L3
|-  style="text-align:center; background:#bfb;"
| 17 || April 22 || @ Dodgers || 5–4 || Lefferts (1–0) || || || Dodger Stadium || 48,347 || 10–7 || W1
|-  style="text-align:center; background:#fbb;"
| 18 || April 23 || @ Dodgers || 6–7 (10) || || Hammaker (1–2) || || Dodger Stadium || 48,493 || 10–8 || L1
|-  style="text-align:center; background:#bfb;"
| 19 || April 25 || @ Cardinals || 4–0 || Robinson (1–1) || || Lefferts (3) || Busch Stadium || 27,911 || 11–8 || W1
|-  style="text-align:center; background:#fbb;"
| 20 || April 26 || @ Cardinals || 1–3 || || Downs (2–3) || || Busch Stadium || 27,514 || 11–9 || L1
|-  style="text-align:center; background:#fbb;"
| 21 || April 27 || @ Cardinals || 1–10 || || Garrelts (2–1) || || Busch Stadium || 30,825 || 11–10 || L2
|-  style="text-align:center; background:#fbb;"
| 22 || April 28 || @ Pirates || 0–1 || || Reuschel (3–2) || || Three Rivers Stadium || 12,913 || 11–11 || L1
|-  style="text-align:center; background:#bfb;"
| 23 || April 29 || @ Pirates || 4–3 || LaCoss (1–1) || || || Three Rivers Stadium || 11,509 || 12–11 || W1
|-  style="text-align:center; background:#fbb;"
| 24 || April 30 || @ Pirates || 1–11 || || Robinson (1–2) || || Three Rivers Stadium || 20,940 || 12–12 || L1
|-

|-  style="text-align:center; background:#fbb;"
| 25 || May 1 || Cubs || 3–4 (12) || || LaCoss (1–2) || || Candlestick Park || 17,914 || 12–13 || L2
|-  style="text-align:center; background:#bfb;"
| 26 || May 2 || Cubs || 4–0 || Reuschel (4–2) || || Gossage (1) || Candlestick Park || 11,128 || 13–13 || W1
|-  style="text-align:center; background:#fbb;"
| 27 || May 3 || Pirates || 3–5 || || Robinson (1–3) || || Candlestick Park || 8,536 || 13–14 || L1
|-  style="text-align:center; background:#bfb;"
| 28 || May 4 || Pirates || 6–3 || Krukow (1–0) || || Lefferts (4) || Candlestick Park || 11,820 || 14–14 || W1
|-  style="text-align:center; background:#fbb;"
| 29 || May 5 || Cardinals || 1–3 || || LaCoss (1–3) || || Candlestick Park || 24,401 || 14–15 || L1
|-  style="text-align:center; background:#bfb;"
| 30 || May 6 || Cardinals || 9–0 || Reuschel (5–2) || || LaCoss (3) || Candlestick Park || 26,925 || 15–15 || W1
|-  style="text-align:center; background:#bfb;"
| 31 || May 7 || Cardinals || 5–1 || Robinson (2–3) || || || Candlestick Park || 50,492 || 16–15 || W2
|-  style="text-align:center; background:#bfb;"
| 32 || May 9 || @ Cubs || 4–2 || Krukow (2–0) || || Lefferts (5) || Wrigley Field || 13,949 || 17–15 || W3
|-  style="text-align:center; background:#bfb;"
| 33 || May 10 || @ Cubs || 4–3 || LaCoss (2–3) || || Lefferts (6) || Wrigley Field || 25,638 || 18–15 || W4
|-  style="text-align:center; background:#bfb;"
| 34 || May 12 || @ Expos || 2–1 || Reuschel (6–2) || || Gossage (2) || Olympic Stadium || 15,851 || 19–15 || W5
|-  style="text-align:center; background:#fbb;"
| 35 || May 13 || @ Expos || 4–5 || || Hammaker (1–3) || || Olympic Stadium || 13,029 || 19–16 || L1
|-  style="text-align:center; background:#fbb;"
| 36 || May 14 || @ Expos || 3–4 || || Krukow (2–1) || || Olympic Stadium || 19,835 || 19–17 || L2
|-  style="text-align:center; background:#fbb;"
| 37 || May 15 || @ Phillies || 2–3 (12) || || Lefferts (1–1) || || Veterans Stadium || 15,703 || 19–18 || L3
|-  style="text-align:center; background:#bfb;"
| 38 || May 16 || @ Phillies || 13–5 || Hammaker (2–3) || || || Veterans Stadium || 14,074 || 20–18 || W1
|-  style="text-align:center; background:#bfb;"
| 39 || May 17 || @ Phillies || 6–0 || Reuschel (7–2) || || || Veterans Stadium || 18,943 || 21–18 || W2
|-  style="text-align:center; background:#fbb;"
| 40 || May 19 || @ Mets || 2–3 (10) || || Lefferts (1–2) || || Shea Stadium || 37,402 || 21–19 || L1
|-  style="text-align:center; background:#bfb;"
| 41 || May 20 || @ Mets || 3–0 || Krukow (3–1) || || LaCoss (4) || Shea Stadium || 45,562 || 22–19 || W1
|-  style="text-align:center; background:#bfb;"
| 42 || May 21 || @ Mets || 10–6 || Hammaker (3–3) || || Lefferts (7) || Shea Stadium || 44,660 || 23–19 || W2
|-  style="text-align:center; background:#bfb;"
| 43 || May 23 || Expos || 4–2 || Reuschel (8–2) || || LaCoss (5) || Candlestick Park || 13,018 || 24–19 || W3
|-  style="text-align:center; background:#fbb;"
| 44 || May 24 || Expos || 0–1 || || Robinson (2–4) || || Candlestick Park || 9,889 || 24–20 || L1
|-  style="text-align:center; background:#fbb;"
| 45 || May 25 || Expos || 0–2 || || Krukow (3–2) || || Candlestick Park || 14,125 || 24–21 || L2
|-  style="text-align:center; background:#bfb;"
| 46 || May 26 || Phillies || 6–1 || Garrelts (3–1) || || || Candlestick Park || 12,787 || 25–21 || W1
|-  style="text-align:center; background:#bfb;"
| 47 || May 27 || Phillies || 6–2 || Hammaker (4–3) || || Lefferts (8) || Candlestick Park || 18,325 || 26–21 || W2
|-  style="text-align:center; background:#bfb;"
| 48 || May 28 || Phillies || 8–5 || Reuschel (9–2) || || LaCoss (6) || Candlestick Park || 51,498 || 27–21 || W3
|-  style="text-align:center; background:#bfb;"
| 49 || May 29 || Mets || 3–2 || Robinson (3–4) || || Lefferts (9) || Candlestick Park || 38,899 || 28–21 || W4
|-  style="text-align:center; background:#bfb;"
| 50 || May 30 || Mets || 10–3 || Krukow (4–2) || || || Candlestick Park || 17,398 || 29–21 || W5
|-  style="text-align:center; background:#fbb;"
| 51 || May 31 || Mets || 1–3 (10) || || Lefferts (1–3) || || Candlestick Park || 21,568 || 29–22 || L1
|-

|-  style="text-align:center; background:#bfb;"
| 52 || June 2 || @ Braves || 7–6 || Reuschel (10–2) || || Gossage (3) || Atlanta–Fulton County Stadium || 14,052 || 30–22 || W1
|-  style="text-align:center; background:#bfb;"
| 53 || June 3 || @ Braves || 4–0 || Hammaker (5–3) || || || Atlanta–Fulton County Stadium || 16,181 || 31–22 || W2
|-  style="text-align:center; background:#fbb;"
| 54 || June 4 || @ Braves || 3–6 || || Krukow (4–3) || || Atlanta–Fulton County Stadium || 13,700 || 31–23 || L1
|-  style="text-align:center; background:#bfb;"
| 55 || June 5 || @ Reds || 11–8 || Garrelts (4–1) || || || Riverfront Stadium || 20,828 || 32–23 || W1
|-  style="text-align:center; background:#fbb;"
| 56 || June 6 || @ Reds || 3–4 || || LaCoss (2–4) || || Riverfront Stadium || n/a || 33–23 || L1
|-  style="text-align:center; background:#bfb;"
| 57 || June 6 || @ Reds || 3–2 || Reuschel (11–2) || || Lefferts (10) || Riverfront Stadium || 28,830 || 33–24 || W1
|-  style="text-align:center; background:#fbb;"
| 58 || June 7 || @ Reds || 5–12 || || Hammaker (5–4) || || Riverfront Stadium || 25,896 || 33–25 || L1
|-  style="text-align:center; background:#fbb;"
| 59 || June 8 || @ Reds || 2–3 || || LaCoss (2–5) || || Riverfront Stadium || 29,217 || 33–26 || L2
|-  style="text-align:center; background:#bfb;"
| 60 || June 9 || Padres || 12–2 || Robinson (4–4) || || || Candlestick Park || 17,463 || 34–26 || W1
|-  style="text-align:center; background:#bfb;"
| 61 || June 10 || Padres || 1–0 || Garrelts (5–1) || || Lefferts (11) || Candlestick Park || 29,116 || 35–26 || W2
|-  style="text-align:center; background:#bfb;"
| 62 || June 11 || Padres || 3–1 (12) || Gossage (1–0) || || || Candlestick Park || 42,003 || 36–26 || W3
|-  style="text-align:center; background:#bfb;"
| 63 || June 13 || Braves || 3–2 || Hammaker (6–4) || || Lefferts (12) || Candlestick Park || 10,484 || 37–26 || W4
|-  style="text-align:center; background:#bfb;"
| 64 || June 14 || Braves || 10–1 || Robinson (5–4) || || || Candlestick Park || 12,140 || 38–26 || W5
|-  style="text-align:center; background:#fbb;"
| 65 || June 15 || Braves || 1–2 || || Garrelts (5–2) || || Candlestick Park || 9,403 || 38–27 || L1
|-  style="text-align:center; background:#fbb;"
| 66 || June 16 || Reds || 4–5 || || Gossage (1–1) || || Candlestick Park || 23,986 || 38–28 || L2
|-  style="text-align:center; background:#bfb;"
| 67 || June 17 || Reds || 8–1 || Cook (1–0) || || || Candlestick Park || 34,476 || 39–28 || W1
|-  style="text-align:center; background:#bfb;"
| 68 || June 18 || Reds || 2–1 || LaCoss (3–5) || || Lefferts (13) || Candlestick Park || 44,542 || 40–28 || W2
|-  style="text-align:center; background:#bfb;"
| 69 || June 19 || Astros || 3–2 || Robinson (6–4) || || Bedrosian (1) || Candlestick Park || 22,386 || 41–28 || W3
|-  style="text-align:center; background:#bfb;"
| 70 || June 20 || Astros || 4–0 || Garrelts (6–2) || || Lefferts (14) || Candlestick Park || 21,074 || 42–28 || W4
|-  style="text-align:center; background:#bfb;"
| 71 || June 21 || Astros || 2–0 || Reuschel (12–2) || || Bedrosian (2) || Candlestick Park || 32,730 || 43–28 || W5
|-  style="text-align:center; background:#bfb;"
| 72 || June 23 || @ Padres || 8–7 || Gossage (2–1) || || Bedrosian (3) || Jack Murphy Stadium || 21,721 || 44–28 || W6
|-  style="text-align:center; background:#bfb;"
| 73 || June 24 || @ Padres || 3–1 || Robinson (7–4) || || Bedrosian (4) || Jack Murphy Stadium || 32,615 || 45–28 || W7
|-  style="text-align:center; background:#fbb;"
| 74 || June 25 || @ Padres || 7–10 || || Garrelts (6–3) || || Jack Murphy Stadium || 41,028 || 45–29 || L1
|-  style="text-align:center; background:#bfb;"
| 75 || June 26 || @ Astros || 4–3 || Lefferts (2–3) || || Bedrosian (5) || Astrodome || 11,616 || 46–29 || W1
|-  style="text-align:center; background:#fbb;"
| 76 || June 27 || @ Astros || 5–7 || || Bedrosian (0–1) || || Astrodome || 33,231 || 46–30 || L1
|-  style="text-align:center; background:#fbb;"
| 77 || June 28 || @ Astros || 3–7 || || Robinson (7–5) || || Astrodome || 29,817 || 46–31 || L2
|-  style="text-align:center; background:#bfb;"
| 78 || June 29 || Cubs || 12–2 || Brantley (1–0) || || || Candlestick Park || 12,339 || 47–31 || W1
|-  style="text-align:center; background:#fbb;"
| 79 || June 30 || Cubs || 4–6 || || Wilson (0–1) || || Candlestick Park || 49,241 || 47–32 || L1
|-

|-  style="text-align:center; background:#fbb;"
| 80 || July 1 || Cubs || 2–3 || || Reuschel (12–3) || || Candlestick Park || 29,019 || 47–33 || L2
|-  style="text-align:center; background:#bfb;"
| 81 || July 2 || Cubs || 4–3 || Brantley (2–0) || || Bedrosian (6) || Candlestick Park || 41,350 || 48–33 || W1
|-  style="text-align:center; background:#fbb;"
| 82 || July 4 || @ Pirates || 3–5 || || Robinson (7–6) || || Three Rivers Stadium || 14,186 || 48–34 || L1
|-  style="text-align:center; background:#bfb;"
| 83 || July 5 || @ Pirates || 6–4 || Wilson (1–1) || || || Three Rivers Stadium || 22,242 || 49–34 || W1
|-  style="text-align:center; background:#bfb;"
| 84 || July 6 || @ Pirates || 2–1 (10) || Brantley (3–0) || || Lefferts (15) || Three Rivers Stadium || 18,165 || 50–34 || W2
|-  style="text-align:center; background:#fbb;"
| 85 || July 7 || @ Cardinals || 4–6 || || LaCoss (3–6) || || Busch Stadium || 42,627 || 50–35 || L1
|-  style="text-align:center; background:#bfb;"
| 86 || July 8 || @ Cardinals || 8–5 || Brantley (4–0) || || || Busch Stadium || 47,400 || 51–35 || W1
|-  style="text-align:center; background:#fbb;"
| 87 || July 9 || @ Cardinals || 4–6 || || Wilson (1–2) || || Busch Stadium || 41,985 || 51–36 || L1
|-  style="text-align:center; background:#bfb;"
| 88 || July 13 || Pirates || 3–2 (13) || Brantley (5–0) || || || Candlestick Park || 17,178 || 52–36 || W1
|-  style="text-align:center; background:#fbb;"
| 89 || July 14 || Pirates || 4–7 || || Reuschel (12–4) || || Candlestick Park || 18,238 || 52–37 || L1
|-  style="text-align:center; background:#bfb;"
| 90 || July 15 || Pirates || 8–3 || LaCoss (4–6) || || || Candlestick Park || 27,881 || 53–37 || W1
|-  style="text-align:center; background:#bfb;"
| 91 || July 16 || Pirates || 3–1 || Garrelts (7–3) || || Bedrosian (7) || Candlestick Park || 44,781 || 54–37 || W2
|-  style="text-align:center; background:#bfb;"
| 92 || July 17 || Cardinals || 8–4 || McCament (1–0) || || Gossage (4) || Candlestick Park || 25,643 || 55–37 || W3
|-  style="text-align:center; background:#bfb;"
| 93 || July 18 || Cardinals || 7–3 || Robinson (8–6) || || || Candlestick Park || 18,112 || 56–37 || W4
|-  style="text-align:center; background:#bfb;"
| 94 || July 19 || Cardinals || 7–5 || Brantley (6–0) || || Lefferts (16) || Candlestick Park || 38,282 || 57–37 || W5
|-  style="text-align:center; background:#fbb;"
| 95 || July 20 || @ Cubs || 3–4 (11) || || McCament (1–1) || || Wrigley Field || 32,306 || 57–38 || L1
|-  style="text-align:center; background:#bfb;"
| 96 || July 21 || @ Cubs || 4–3 || Garrelts (8–3) || || Lefferts (17) || Wrigley Field || 34,725 || 58–38 || W1
|-  style="text-align:center; background:#fbb;"
| 97 || July 22 || @ Cubs || 2–5 || || Hammaker (6–5) || || Wrigley Field || 35,530 || 58–39 || L1
|-  style="text-align:center; background:#fbb;"
| 98 || July 23 || @ Cubs || 5–9 || || Robinson (8–7) || || Wrigley Field || 35,707 || 58–40 || L2
|-  style="text-align:center; background:#bfb;"
| 99 || July 24 || @ Braves || 2–0 || Reuschel (13–4) || || Bedrosian (8) || Atlanta–Fulton County Stadium || 12,985 || 59–40 || W1
|-  style="text-align:center; background:#bfb;"
| 100 || July 25 || @ Braves || 5–4 || LaCoss (5–6) || || Lefferts (18) || Atlanta–Fulton County Stadium || 10,564 || 60–40 || W2
|-  style="text-align:center; background:#fbb;"
| 101 || July 26 || @ Braves || 4–5 || || Bedrosian (0–2) || || Atlanta–Fulton County Stadium || 8,055 || 60–41 || L1
|-  style="text-align:center; background:#fbb;"
| 102 || July 27 || @ Braves || 1–10 || || Hammaker (6–6) || || Atlanta–Fulton County Stadium || 10,471 || 60–42 || L2
|-  style="text-align:center; background:#bfb;"
| 103 || July 28 || @ Astros || 3–2 || Robinson (9–7) || || || Astrodome || 38,845 || 61–42 || W1
|-  style="text-align:center; background:#fbb;"
| 104 || July 29 || @ Astros || 1–8 || || Reuschel (13–5) || || Astrodome || 39,602 || 61–43 || L1
|-  style="text-align:center; background:#fbb;"
| 105 || July 30 || @ Astros || 2–6 || || LaCoss (5–7) || || Astrodome || 41,088 || 61–44 || L2
|-

|-  style="text-align:center; background:#bfb;"
| 106 || August 1 || @ Dodgers || 5–2 || Garrelts (9–3) || || Lefferts (19) || Dodger Stadium || 35,716 || 62–44 || W1
|-  style="text-align:center; background:#fbb;"
| 107 || August 2 || @ Dodgers || 4–7 || || Wilson (1–3) || || Dodger Stadium || 45,478 || 62–45 || L1
|-  style="text-align:center; background:#fbb;"
| 108 || August 3 || @ Dodgers || 3–6 || || Swan (0–1) || || Dodger Stadium || 43,516 || 62–46 || L2
|-  style="text-align:center; background:#bfb;"
| 109 || August 4 || Astros || 4–2 || Robinson (10–7) || || || Candlestick Park || 26,648 || 63–46 || W1
|-  style="text-align:center; background:#bfb;"
| 110 || August 5 || Astros || 7–0 || LaCoss (6–7) || || || Candlestick Park || 33,736 || 64–46 || W2
|-  style="text-align:center; background:#fbb;"
| 111 || August 6 || Astros || 2–3 || || Lefferts (2–4) || || Candlestick Park || 52,292 || 65–46 || W3
|-  style="text-align:center; background:#fbb;"
| 112 || August 7 || Reds || 2–10 || || Brantley (6–1) || || Candlestick Park || 23,905 || 65–47 || L1
|-  style="text-align:center; background:#fbb;"
| 113 || August 8 || Reds || 4–10 || || Swan (0–2) || || Candlestick Park || 20,765 || 65–48 || L2
|-  style="text-align:center; background:#bfb;"
| 114 || August 9 || Reds || 10–1 || Robinson (11–7) || || || Candlestick Park || 29,441 || 66–48 || W1
|-  style="text-align:center; background:#bfb;"
| 115 || August 10 || Reds || 4–3 || Dravecky (1–0) || || Bedrosian (9) || Candlestick Park || 34,810 || 67–48 || W2
|-  style="text-align:center; background:#bfb;"
| 116 || August 11 || Dodgers || 10–2 || LaCoss (7–7) || || || Candlestick Park || 33,307 || 68–48 || W3
|-  style="text-align:center; background:#fbb;"
| 117 || August 12 || Dodgers || 1–5 || || Knepper (0–1) || || Candlestick Park || 49,772 || 68–49 || L1
|-  style="text-align:center; background:#fbb;"
| 118 || August 13 || Dodgers || 2–3 (12) || || Robinson (11–8) || || Candlestick Park || 53,821 || 68–50 || L2
|-  style="text-align:center; background:#bfb;"
| 119 || August 15 || @ Expos || 3–2 || Dravecky (2–0) || || Bedrosian (10) || Olympic Stadium || 24,490 || 69–50 || W1
|-  style="text-align:center; background:#fbb;"
| 120 || August 16 || @ Expos || 2–4 || || Bedrosian (0–3) || || Olympic Stadium || 24,719 || 69–51 || L1
|-  style="text-align:center; background:#bfb;"
| 121 || August 17 || @ Expos || 10–5 || Knepper (1–1) || || || Olympic Stadium || 21,057 || 70–51 || W1
|-  style="text-align:center; background:#bfb;"
| 122 || August 18 || @ Phillies || 5–2 || Reuschel (14–5) || || Bedrosian (11) || Veterans Stadium || 23,368 || 71–51 || W2
|-  style="text-align:center; background:#fbb;"
| 123 || August 19 || @ Phillies || 0–1 || || Downs (2–4) || || Veterans Stadium || 30,366 || 71–52 || L1
|-  style="text-align:center; background:#bfb;"
| 124 || August 20 || @ Phillies || 5–2 || Brantley (7–1) || || || Veterans Stadium || 36,530 || 72–52 || W1
|-  style="text-align:center; background:#fbb;"
| 125 || August 21 || @ Mets || 1–4 || || LaCoss (7–8) || || Shea Stadium || 41,200 || 72–53 || L1
|-  style="text-align:center; background:#bfb;"
| 126 || August 22 || @ Mets || 5–0 || Knepper (2–1) || || || Shea Stadium || 48,249 || 73–53 || W1
|-  style="text-align:center; background:#bfb;"
| 127 || August 23 || @ Mets || 5–0 || Reuschel (15–5) || || || Shea Stadium || 43,694 || 74–53 || W2
|-  style="text-align:center; background:#fbb;"
| 128 || August 25 || Expos || 2–12 || || Downs (2–5) || || Candlestick Park || 23,272 || 74–54 || L1
|-  style="text-align:center; background:#bfb;"
| 129 || August 26 || Expos || 8–3 || Garrelts (10–3) || || || Candlestick Park || 29,527 || 74–55 || W1
|-  style="text-align:center; background:#fbb;"
| 130 || August 27 || Expos || 3–6 || || LaCoss (7–9) || || Candlestick Park || 31,536 || 74–56 || L1
|-  style="text-align:center; background:#fbb;"
| 131 || August 28 || Phillies || 1–9 || || Reuschel (15–6) || || Candlestick Park || 15,614 || 74–57 || L2
|-  style="text-align:center; background:#fbb;"
| 132 || August 29 || Phillies || 1–6 || || Robinson (11–9) || || Candlestick Park || 13,952 || 74–58 || L3
|-  style="text-align:center; background:#bfb;"
| 133 || August 30 || Phillies || 3–2 || Downs (3–5) || || Bedrosian (12) || Candlestick Park || 19,053 || 75–58 || W1
|-

|-  style="text-align:center; background:#bfb;"
| 134 || September 1 || Mets || 7–1 || Garrelts (11–3) || || || Candlestick Park || 29,413 || 76–58 || W2
|-  style="text-align:center; background:#bfb;"
| 135 || September 2 || Mets || 6–2 || Reuschel (16–6) || || || Candlestick Park || 31,066 || 77–58 || W3
|-  style="text-align:center; background:#bfb;"
| 136 || September 3 || Mets || 4–0 || Robinson (12–9) || || || Candlestick Park || 44,084 || 78–58 || W4
|-  style="text-align:center; background:#bfb;"
| 137 || September 4 || @ Reds || 9–8 || Camacho (1–0) || || Bedrosian (13) || Riverfront Stadium || 15,140 || 79–58 || W5
|-  style="text-align:center; background:#fbb;"
| 138 || September 5 || @ Reds || 5–6 || || LaCoss (7–10) || || Riverfront Stadium || 16,389 || 79–59 || L1
|-  style="text-align:center; background:#bfb;"
| 139 || September 6 || @ Braves || 7–2 || Garrelts (12–3) || || || Atlanta–Fulton County Stadium || 2,735 || 80–59 || W1
|-  style="text-align:center; background:#bfb;"
| 140 || September 7 || @ Braves || 7–5 || Bedrosian (1–3) || || || Atlanta–Fulton County Stadium || 4,474 || 81–59 || W2
|-  style="text-align:center; background:#fbb;"
| 141 || September 8 || @ Astros || 2–5 || || Robinson (12–10) || || Astrodome || 24,405 || 81–60 || L1
|-  style="text-align:center; background:#fbb;"
| 142 || September 9 || @ Astros || 1–4 || || Downs (3–6) || || Astrodome || 37,711 || 81–61 || L2
|-  style="text-align:center; background:#bfb;"
| 143 || September 10 || @ Astros || 5–3 || Knepper (3–1) || || Lefferts (20) || Astrodome || 26,004 || 82–61 || W1
|-  style="text-align:center; background:#bfb;"
| 144 || September 11 || Braves || 3–2 || Garrelts (13–3) || || Bedrosian (14) || Candlestick Park || 11,930 || 83–61 || W2
|-  style="text-align:center; background:#fbb;"
| 145 || September 12 || Braves || 5–6 || || Bedrosian (1–4) || || Candlestick Park || 11,077 || 83–62 || L1
|-  style="text-align:center; background:#bfb;"
| 146 || September 13 || Reds || 8–7 (13) || Camacho (2–0) || || || Candlestick Park || 13,827 || 84–62 ||  W1
|-  style="text-align:center; background:#bfb;"
| 147 || September 14 || Reds || 4–3 (12) || Camacho (3–0) || || || Candlestick Park || 15,969 || 85–62 || W2
|-  style="text-align:center; background:#fbb;"
| 148 || September 15 || Padres || 3–5 || || Knepper (3–2) || || Candlestick Park || 33,920 || 85–63 || L1
|-  style="text-align:center; background:#bfb;"
| 149 || September 17 || Padres || 5–3 || Garrelts (14–3) || || Bedrosian (15) || Candlestick Park || n/a || 86–63 || W1
|-  style="text-align:center; background:#fbb;"
| 150 || September 17 || Padres || 1–6 || || Reuschel (16–7) || || Candlestick Park || 25,543 || 86–64 || L1
|-  style="text-align:center; background:#bfb;"
| 151 || September 19 || Dodgers || 3–2 || LaCoss (8–10) || || Bedrosian (16) || Candlestick Park || 20,668 || 87–64 || W1
|-  style="text-align:center; background:#bfb;"
| 152 || September 20 || Dodgers || 8–7 || Wilson (2–3) || || || Candlestick Park || 21,420 || 88–64 || W2
|-  style="text-align:center; background:#bfb;"
| 153 || September 21 || Dodgers || 4–3 || Downs (4–6) || || Bedrosian (17) || Candlestick Park || 24,896 || 89–64 || W3
|-  style="text-align:center; background:#fbb;"
| 154 || September 22 || Astros || 1–3 || || Garrelts (14–4) || || Candlestick Park || 33,020 || 89–65 || L1
|-  style="text-align:center; background:#bfb;"
| 155 || September 23 || Astros || 3–1 || Reuschel (17–7) || || || Candlestick Park || 46,664 || 90–65 || W1
|-  style="text-align:center; background:#bfb;"
| 156 || September 24 || Astros || 10–2 || LaCoss (9–10) || || || Candlestick Park || 50,871 || 91–65 || W2
|-  style="text-align:center; background:#fbb;"
| 157 || September 25 || @ Dodgers || 2–5 || || Robinson (12–11) || || Dodger Stadium || 23,007 || 91–66 || L1
|-  style="text-align:center; background:#fbb;"
| 158 || September 26 || @ Dodgers || 1–2 || || Downs (4–7) || || Dodger Stadium || 27,662 || 91–67 || L2
|-  style="text-align:center; background:#fbb;"
| 159 || September 27 || @ Dodgers || 0–1 || || Garrelts (14–5) || || Dodger Stadium || 34,210 || 91–68 || L3
|-  style="text-align:center; background:#bfb;"
| 160 || September 29 || @ Padres || 7–2 || LaCoss (10–10) || || || Jack Murphy Stadium || 52,089 || 92–68 || W1
|-  style="text-align:center; background:#fbb;"
| 161 || September 30 || @ Padres || 5–11 || || Reuschel (17–8) || || Jack Murphy Stadium || 47,787 || 92–69 || L1
|-

|-  style="text-align:center; background:#fbb;"
| 162 || October 1 || @ Padres || 0–3 || || Downs (4–8) || || Jack Murphy Stadium || 24,031 || 92–70 || L2
|-

Postseason

|-  style="text-align:center; background:#bfb;"
| 1 NLCS || October 4 || @ Cubs || 11–3 || Garrelts (1–0) || Maddux (0–1) || || Wrigley Field || 39,195 || 1–0 || W1
|-  style="text-align:center; background:#fbb;"
| 2 NLCS || October 5 || @ Cubs || 5–9 || Lancaster (1–0) || Reuschel (0–1) || || Wrigley Field || 39,195 || 1–1 || L1
|-  style="text-align:center; background:#bfb;"
| 3 NLCS || October 7 || Cubs || 5–4 || Robinson (1–0) || Lancaster (1–1) || Bedrosian (1) || Candlestick Park || 62,065 || 2–1 || W1
|-  style="text-align:center; background:#bfb;"
| 4 NLCS || October 8 || Cubs || 6–4 || Downs (1–0) || Wilson (0–1) || Bedrosian (2) || Candlestick Park || 62,078 || 3–1 || W2
|-  style="text-align:center; background:#bfb;"
| 5 NLCS || October 9 || Cubs || 3–2 || Reuschel (1–1) || Bielecki (0–1) || Bedrosian (3) || Candlestick Park || 62,084 || 4–1 || W3
|-

|-  style="text-align:center; background:#fbb;"
| 1 WS || October 14 || @ Athletics || 0–5 || Stewart (1–0) || Garrelts (0–1) || || Oakland–Alameda County Coliseum || 49,385 || 0–1 || L1
|-  style="text-align:center; background:#fbb;"
| 2 WS || October 15 || @ Athletics || 1–5 || Moore (1–0) || Reuschel (0–1) || || Oakland–Alameda County Coliseum || 49,388 || 0–2 || L2
|-  style="text-align:center; background:#fbb;"
| 3 WS || October 27 || Athletics || 7–13 || Stewart (2–0) || Garrelts (0–2) || || Candlestick Park || 62,038 || 0–3 || L3
|-  style="text-align:center; background:#fbb;"
| 4 WS || October 28 || Athletics || 6–9 || Moore (2–0) || Robinson (0–1) || Eckersley (1) || Candlestick Park || 62,032 || 0–4 || L4
|-

Roster

Dave Dravecky
The previous season, a cancerous desmoid tumor was found in Dravecky's pitching arm. He underwent surgery on October 7, 1988, removing half of the deltoid muscle in his pitching arm and freezing the humerus bone in an effort to eliminate all of the cancerous cells. By July 1989, he was pitching in the minors, and on August 10, he made a highly publicized return to the major leagues, pitching 8 innings and defeating Cincinnati 4-3. In his following start five days later against the Expos, Dravecky pitched three no-hit innings, but in the fifth inning, he felt a tingling sensation in his arm. In the sixth inning he started off shaky, allowing a home run to the lead off batter and then hitting the second batter. Then, on his first pitch to Tim Raines, his humerus bone snapped, ending his career.

To see a pitcher break his arm with a loud cracking sound while doing something as ordinary as throwing a pitch, then fall to the ground rolling in agonizing pain, was shocking, unusual, and upsetting, especially for those who had followed his touching story.  The pitch was replayed on television repeatedly over the following days.

The Giants won the National League pennant in 1989, and in the post-game celebration, Dravecky's arm was broken a second time. A doctor examining Dravecky's x-rays noticed a mass in his arm. Cancer had returned. Eighteen days later, Dravecky retired from baseball, aged 33, leaving a 64-57 record with 558 strikeouts and a 3.13 ERA in 1,062.2 innings.  He won the 1989 Willie Mac Award honoring his spirit and leadership.

Player stats

Batting

Starters by position 
Note: Pos = Position; G = Games played; AB = At bats; H = Hits; Avg. = Batting average; HR = Home runs; RBI = Runs batted in

Other batters 
Note: G = Games played; AB = At bats; H = Hits; Avg. = Batting average; HR = Home runs; RBI = Runs batted in

Pitching

Starting pitchers 
Note: G = Games pitched; IP = Innings pitched; W = Wins; L = Losses; ERA = Earned run average; SO = Strikeouts

Other pitchers 
Note: G = Games pitched; IP = Innings pitched; W = Wins; L = Losses; ERA = Earned run average; SO = Strikeouts

Relief pitchers 
Note: G = Games pitched; W = Wins; L = Losses; SV = Saves; ERA = Earned run average; SO = Strikeouts

National League Championship Series

Game 1
October 4 at Wrigley Field in Chicago

Game 2
October 5 at Wrigley Field in Chicago

Game 3
October 7 at Candlestick Park in San Francisco, California

Game 4
October 8 at Candlestick Park in San Francisco, California

Game 5
October 9 at Candlestick Park in San Francisco, California

The Giants made it to their first World Series since 1962 with a 3-2 win over the Cubs to win the 1989 National League pennant, four games to one. The final game pitted Mike Bielecki against a well-rested (due to his quick exit from Game 2) Rick Reuschel. Reuschel made amends for his poor start in Game 2 by giving up only one run over eight innings. The one run Reuschel gave up was an unearned run the Cubs scored when Walton reached on an error by Mitchell and then scored on Sandberg's double. The Cubs held the 1-0 lead until the seventh inning when Will Clark tripled and scored on Mitchell's sacrifice fly.

With two outs in the eighth, the Cubs appeared ready to perhaps send the series back to Chicago. But Candy Maldonado pinch-hit for Reuschel and walked. Bielcki then proceeded the load the bases by walking both Butler and Thompson. Don Zimmer sent for Mitch Williams to end the jam, but Clark drove a single to center that gave the Giants a 3-1 lead. The Cubs strung together three straight singles with two outs in the ninth to pull within a run, but Bedrosian got Sandberg to ground out to second to end the game and the series.

The Giants were in their first World Series since 1962. Clark's stellar performance earned him Most Valuable Player honors for the Giants. Clark hit .650 with eight RBIs.

World series

It was the first World Series in which the losing team never had the lead and never had the tying run at the plate in its final turn at-bat.

Game 1
October 14, 1989, at Oakland Coliseum in Oakland, California.

Game 2
October 15, 1989, at Oakland Coliseum in Oakland, California

Game 3
October 17, 1989, at Candlestick Park in San Francisco

The game was delayed until October 27, or about ten days, due to the Loma Prieta earthquake.

Game 4
October 28, 1989, at Candlestick Park in San Francisco

Award winners
 Will Clark, NLCS MVP
 Dave Dravecky, Hutch Award
 Dave Dravecky, Willie Mac Award
 Kevin Mitchell, National League MVP
All-Star Game

Farm system

References

External links
 1989 San Francisco Giants at Baseball Reference
 1989 San Francisco Giants at Baseball Almanac

National League West champion seasons
National League champion seasons
San Francisco Giants seasons
San Francisco Giants
San Francisco Giants
San